The chestnut-breasted whiteface (Aphelocephala pectoralis) is a species of bird in the family Acanthizidae. It is endemic to Australia. Its natural habitat is subtropical or tropical dry shrubland. It is threatened by habitat loss.

References

chestnut-breasted whiteface
Birds of South Australia
Endemic birds of Australia
chestnut-breasted whiteface
Taxonomy articles created by Polbot